Radio Mostarska panorama is a Bosnian local public radio station, broadcasting from Mostar, Bosnia and Herzegovina.

From 2013 until 2018, Mostarska panorama was served as special daily output for Mostar operated by Radio Herceg-Bosne (from 07:00–10:00 hour) on their ceded frequency .

Since 14 August 2018, Mostarska panorama is separated radiostation (launched as part of a public institution Croatian Lodge "Herceg Stjepan Kosača" Mostar) which broadcasts on its own frequency.

Mostarska panorama broadcasts a variety of programs such as local news from Mostar area, talk shows, music and sport. Program is mainly produced in Croatian. Estimated number of potential listeners is around 95,173. The radio station is also available in municipalities of West Herzegovina.

Frequencies
 Mostar

See also 
List of radio stations in Bosnia and Herzegovina

References

External links 
 www.fmscan.org
 www.mostarski.ba
 Communications Regulatory Agency of Bosnia and Herzegovina

Mostar
Radio stations established in 2018
Mass media in Mostar